Alberto Fait Lizano (1929 – 2 June 1997) was a Costa Rican politician who was First Vice President of Costa Rica between 1982 and 1986, serving under president Luis Alberto Monge. He was also a Deputy in the Legislative Assembly of Costa Rica between 1986 and 1990.

References

1929 births
1997 deaths
Costa Rican politicians